Jaime Fernández Bernabé (born June 4, 1993) is a Spanish professional basketball player for Lenovo Tenerife of the Liga ACB.

He was on the Spain men's national basketball team that won the 2009 U-16 and 2011 U-18 tournaments.

On July 8, 2022, Fernández signed with Lenovo Tenerife of the Spanish Liga ACB.

References

ACB profile

External links
Jaime Fernández at fibaeurope.com

1993 births
Living people
Baloncesto Málaga players
Basketball players from Madrid
BC Andorra players
CB Canarias players
CB Estudiantes players
Liga ACB players
Point guards
Spanish expatriate basketball people in Andorra
Spanish men's basketball players